Restless Days may refer to:

 "Restless Days" (song), a 1980 single by And Why Not?
 Restless Days (album), a 2009 album by The Clarks